Leviathan (1823-1846) was a British Thoroughbred racehorse who won 16 of 21 starts before injury prompted his retirement. Imported into Tennessee in 1830, he was the leading sire in North America of 1837, 1838, 1839, 1843 and 1848, and also finished second five times. He was also an important broodmare sire, with modern descendants through the female line including Affirmed, Alydar and Dance Smartly.

Background
Leviathan was a chestnut stallion of a "peculiar shade of deep red or mahogany" with a narrow blaze as his sole white marking. He was bred by John Painter and foaled in 1823 at Dean's Hill stud in Staffordshire. He was sired by Muley, who won two of five starts in his racing career. Muley originally received little support at stud until Leviathan helped establish his reputation. Muley would subsequently sire three classic winners: Margrave, Vespa and Little Wonder. Leviathan's dam was an unnamed daughter of Windle.

Originally named Mezereon, the horse was renamed Leviathan after he was sold to Thomas Giffard at age three. A later stallion advertisement said, "His shoulder-blades are longer, more capacious... than in any other large horse; and, in fact I have seen no horse 15 hands high, whose back is shorter... The sweep in the hind-quarter... is incomparably greater than in any other horse that has been offered to the citizens of Tennessee... He has fine withers, great depth of brisket, great depth of flank, great frame; great length and substance in the bones and muscles of all his quarters, with the very best adaptation of all the parts; and though some object to the too great length of his neck, I am satisfied that seeming defect arises from the great obliquity of his shoulders... The whole assemblage of parts gives him, if not the most beautiful, at least the most grand and majestic appearance."

Racing career
Leviathan (then named Mezereon) raced twice at age two for Painter. He won his first start, a six-furlong sweepstakes at Burton-on-Trent. He then finished second to Little Bo-peep at Wolverhampton.

At age three, Leviathan was undefeated in nine starts for his new owner Giffard. In May, he won the Dee Stakes at Chester at a distance of just over one mile. The next day, he won a sweepstakes over his only rival, Cestus. He made his next start in August at Wolverhampton in the Wrottesley Stakes, defeating his only competitor, Granby, over a distance of about a mile. He then traveled to Burton-on-Trent, where he beat Little Bo-peep in a one-mile sweepstakes. Soon afterwards, he won the Bradby Stakes over about two miles. In September, he traveled to Warwick, where he won both the St. Leger Stakes by walkover and another sweepstakes. He made his final start of the year in late September at Shrewsbury, beating Sancredo in the St. Leger Stakes.

At age four, Leviathan won six of nine starts, finishing second the other three times. In his first start at Chester, he finished second to Dr. Faustus in the Stand Cup. He won his next start, a two-mile sweepstakes at Chester, over Flexible. Traveling to Ludlow, he was beaten by Paul Fry in a -mile sweepstakes, then won the Ludlow Gold Cup over three miles, defeating Cain, Paul Pry and Palatine. In July, he won the Derby Gold Cup at Derby. At Wolverhampton, he finished second to Euxton in the Darlington Cup over 3 miles. He made his only start over 4 miles in the Gold Cup at Warwick, in which he defeated Euxton in a time of seven minutes flat. His final start was the Gold Cup at Lichfield over 3 miles, which he won by walkover.

Leviathan was then sold for 2,000 guineas to King George IV, who was interested in winning the Ascot Gold Cup, which was rapidly increasing in prestige. However, Leviathan became unsound and was given a year off to recuperate. He made one last start in 1829 in the Wokingham Stakes at Ascot but was unplaced.

Stud career
Leviathan first stood for stud in 1830 at Bretby Park for George Stanhope, 6th Earl of Chesterfield. His first crop included four winners with two stakes winners, Alexis and Banquet.

In July 1830, Leviathan was sold to James Jackson of Alabama. Leviathan arrived on November 14 at the stud farm of Jackson's racing partner George Elliot in Gallatin, Tennessee. He became the first imported stallion to stand in the "west" since the Revolutionary War and helped establish Tennessee as the center of the southern bloodstock breeding industry. He led the North America sire list in 1837, 1838, 1839, 1843 and 1848, and also finished second five times. He sired many winners who "had almost unprecedented success at all distances, from Nashville to Orleans". In his book Making the American Thoroughbred, James Douglas Anderson stated, "Throughout the entire country he was regarded as "the modern Sir Archy. If you don't know the story of Leviathan you don't know the history of Tennessee."

Leviathan's notable progeny include:
 Angora (filly, 1832), an "elite" racehorse, especially over the four-mile heat racing format that was common at the time
 Lilac (filly, 1832), "one of the fastest horses on earth" 
 Linnet (filly, 1832), multiple stakes winner including the Jockey Club Purse in Nashville and New Orleans
 Zelina (filly, 1832), winner of 14 heat races at distances from one to four miles, with earnings of $13,000
 Wacousta (colt, 1832), multiple wins including the Jockey Club Purse at Florence, Alabama
 Othello (colt, 1832), winner of the Jockey Club Purse at Gallatin, Nashville and Huntsville
 The Poney (colt, 1834), multiple wins including the Jockey Club Purse at Alabama
 Sarah Bladen (filly, 1834), considered his best daughter, with multiple wins from 1836 to 1842 including the Jockey Club Purse at Natchez and New Orleans 
 Beeswing (filly, 1835), winner of eight races including the Jockey Club Purse at New Orleans
 Fandango (filly, 1836), winner of the Champagne Stakes and Jockey Club Purse in Mobile
 Celerity (filly, 1837), winner of the New Orleans Plate and others
 Flight (filly, 1837), won the Barry Sweepstakes after Celerity fell
 John R. Grymes (colt, 1837), won the Proprietor's Purse and Jockey Club Purse at New Orleans
 Jeannettau (filly, 1840), won the Association Purse and Proprietor's Purse at St. Louis
 Ann Hayes (filly, 1840), successful from two to four miles, wins include Jockey Club Purse at Oakley, Mississippi and New Orleans

Some of Leviathan's sons showed promise at stud but the southern breeding industry was disrupted by the American Civil War and his male line became extinct. Several of Leviathan's daughters became important broodmares, and some of their families still exist. Among his most important producers were:
 Fandango (1836, out of Galopade by Catton). Female line descendants include Domino, Hamburg, Twilight Tear and Affirmed
 Cotillion (1837, also out of Galopade by Catton). Female line descendants include Discovery, Crozier and important broodmare No Class, whose descendants include Dance Smartly and Smart Strike
Flight (1837, out of Charlotte Hamilton by Sir Charles). Third dam of Himyar
 Leviathan Mare (1842, out of Anna Marie by Truffle). Descendants include Alydar, Our Mims, Codex and Forward Pass.

Pedigree

Leviathan is inbred to Beningbrough 3S x 3D, meaning Beningbrough appears in the third generation on both the sire and dam's side of the pedigree. Further back, he has multiple crosses to the influential stallions Eclipse (5Sx5Sx5D) and Herod (5Sx5Sx5Sx4Dx5D).

Notes

References

See also
 Pedigreequery online database

1823 racehorse births
1846 racehorse deaths
Racehorses trained in the United Kingdom
Racehorses bred in the United Kingdom
United States Champion Thoroughbred Sires
Thoroughbred family 7